Erica Danielle Rhodes Vega (born February 4, 1986), known professionally as Danielle Vega, is an American actress. Vega is best known for her roles as Kim on the PBS television series Barney & Friends; and as Ceci Camayo on Hulu's drama series East Los High.

Early life
Erica Danielle Rhodes was born in Atlanta, Georgia but was raised in Dallas, Texas. Vega is of mixed African-American, Spanish, British, Cherokee, and Irish descent. Vega attended Southern Methodist University, where she graduated with a degree in journalism. Vega is a member of Alpha Kappa Alpha sorority.

Career
At age 10, Vega appeared in the children's TV show Barney & Friends. In 2009, she auditioned for the ninth season of American Idol, but was later cut in the Hollywood Week auditions. Since then, she has portrayed many roles in her career including in films So This Is Christmas, Betrayed at 17, Teeth and Blood. In 1994, she played herself on Psalty's Songs for Little Praisers the Bible series in volume 1–3.

Filmography

2022 Christmas With My Ex by TVONE

References

External links
 

1986 births
Living people
Actresses from Dallas
Actresses from Texas
African-American actresses
American child actresses
American Idol participants
American people of Irish descent
American people of Spanish descent
American people of Cherokee descent
American people of British descent
Hispanic and Latino American actresses
21st-century American women
20th-century African-American women singers
21st-century African-American women
21st-century African-American musicians